Nikolay Grigorevich Lyashchenko (– 10 October 2000) was a Soviet Army general. He fought on the Republican side in Spain and against Nazi Germany. He was a Hero of the Soviet Union. He was a recipient of the Order of Zhukov, the Order of Lenin, the Order of the October Revolution, the Order of the Red Banner, the Order of Suvorov, the Order of Kutuzov, the Order of the Patriotic War, the Order of the Red Star, and the Order for Service to the Homeland in the Armed Forces of the USSR.

References

1910 births
2000 deaths
People from Zima (town)
People from Irkutsk Governorate
Central Committee of the Communist Party of the Soviet Union members
Army generals (Soviet Union)
Soviet people of the Spanish Civil War
Soviet military personnel of World War II
Heroes of the Soviet Union
Recipients of the Order of Zhukov
Recipients of the Order of Lenin
Recipients of the Order of the Red Banner
Recipients of the Order of Suvorov, 2nd class
Recipients of the Order of Kutuzov, 2nd class
Recipients of the Order "For Service to the Homeland in the Armed Forces of the USSR", 2nd class
Frunze Military Academy alumni
Military Academy of the General Staff of the Armed Forces of the Soviet Union alumni